Rogalands Arbeiderblad was a Norwegian newspaper published in Stavanger in Rogaland county.

History and profile
Rogalands Arbeiderblad was started on 20 November 1926 as the Communist Party organ in the county. It was published weekly. However, the party struggled economically and the newspaper went defunct after its last issue on 3 October 1927. Editor-in-chief was Elias Gabrielsen.

References

1926 establishments in Norway
1927 disestablishments in Norway
Communist Party of Norway newspapers
Defunct newspapers published in Norway
Mass media in Stavanger
Norwegian-language newspapers
Publications established in 1926
Publications disestablished in 1927